Dr. John Adams Bownocker (March 11, 1865 – October 20, 1928) was an American geologist and educator.

Biography
Born in St. Paul Pickaway County, Ohio to parents Michael Bownocker and Eliza (Adams) Bownocker.

Married Anna K. Flint on June 12, 1911.

Died in Columbus Franklin County, Ohio and was buried at Amanda Township, Fairfield County, Ohio Cemetery.

Education and career
Attended Ohio State University, 1883–89, receiving a degree as Bachelor of Science, in June 1889. He attended the University of Ohio from 1889–92 and held various positions in the Geology Department at the Ohio State University. Finally he held the position of Professor of Inorganic Geology, and was also State Geologist of Ohio.

John Adams Bownocker received a degree as Doctor of Science in 1897 and was a Professor and State Geologist at Ohio State University.

He wrote numerous articles and books in the field of Geology. He was a Fellow of the Geological Society of America and also a Fellow of the American Association for the Advancement of Science.

One of the founders of Association of American State Geologists.

The "Bownocker Medal" is awarded by the advanced geologists.

Bibliography
 John Adams Bownocker "The occurrence and exploitation of petroleum and natural gas in Ohio", Columbus : Geological Survey of Ohio, 1903.
 John Adams Bownocker, "Building Stones of Ohio", 1915.
 John Adams Bownocker, "The Bremen Oil Field", 1910.
 John Adams Bownocker, "The coal fields of the United States: General Introduction", 1929.

References

External links
 John Adams Bownocker books list
 Ohio State University Quarterly. 1912. Reprint. London: Forgotten Books, 2013. Print.
 Find a Grave

1865 births
1928 deaths
American geologists
People from Pickaway County, Ohio
Ohio University alumni
Fellows of the Geological Society of America
Fellows of the American Association for the Advancement of Science